Pedro Pascual may refer to:

 Peter Pascual (c. 1227–1299/1300), Mozarabic theologian, bishop, and martyr
 Pasqual Pere Moles (1741–1797), Spanish engraver
 Pedro Pascual (sailor) (born 1996), American sailor

See also
 Pedro Pascal (born 1975), Chilean-American actor